Wyndhurst, also known as Wyndhurst and Preston Place, is a historic home located at Charlottesville, Virginia. It was built in 1857, and is a two-story, three bay,  frame dwelling with Greek Revival style decorative details. It has a low pitched hipped roof, one-story enclosed sun parlor, and two additions are connected by a one-story hyphen.

It was listed on the National Register of Historic Places in 1982.  It is located in the Rugby Road-University Corner Historic District.

References

Houses on the National Register of Historic Places in Virginia
Houses completed in 1857
Greek Revival houses in Virginia
Houses in Charlottesville, Virginia
National Register of Historic Places in Charlottesville, Virginia
Individually listed contributing properties to historic districts on the National Register in Virginia
1857 establishments in Virginia